Nacoleia insolitalis is a moth in the family Crambidae. It was described by Francis Walker in 1862. It is found in Indonesia and Thailand.

References

Moths described in 1862
Nacoleia
Moths of Asia